Matías Fernando Giordano (born 11 September 1979) is a retired Argentine professional footballer who played as a goalkeeper. He is currently the goalkeeper coach of Rosario Central.

Career
Giordano's footballing career began in 1999 with Chacarita Juniors in the Argentine Primera División, but he departed in 2000 after zero appearances. He subsequently joined Deportivo Merlo, before spending the 2002–03 Primera B Metropolitana season with Flandria with whom he featured thirty-three times. 2004 saw him join Deportivo Morón, prior to a return to Deportivo Merlo a year later. In 2005, Giordano was signed by Comunicaciones of Primera B Metropolitana. He went on to make one hundred and five appearances for the club. During his time with Comunicaciones, he was loaned out on two occasions.

Primera B Nacional's Quilmes loaned Giordano in 2008–09, while Torneo Argentino A's Talleres loaned him in 2009–10. A total of forty-two appearances followed with Quilmes and Talleres. Giordano left Comunicaciones in 2010 to join Argentine Primera División team All Boys. His first appearance in Argentina's top-flight came on 10 September 2010 in a tie with Colón. For the rest of the season, he was an unused substitute thirty times. Further moves to Sportivo Desamparados and Brown, either side of a third spell with to Deportivo Merlo, occurred between 2011 and 2014. On 13 August 2014, Giordano joined Huracán.

He played fifteen times in all competitions over four seasons with Huracán, winning the Copa Argentina and Supercopa Argentina, before leaving ahead of the 2017–18 campaign to rejoin Brown in Primera B Nacional. However, after no appearances in a season with Brown, Giordano left in June 2018 to join Primera B Metropolitana team Almirante Brown.

Coaching career
Retiring in 2019, he was hired as a goalkeeper coach for Rosario Central in October 2019.

Career statistics
.

Honours
Huracán
Copa Argentina: 2013–14
Supercopa Argentina: 2014

References

External links

1979 births
Living people
People from Morón Partido
Argentine footballers
Association football goalkeepers
Argentine Primera División players
Primera B Metropolitana players
Primera C Metropolitana players
Primera Nacional players
Torneo Argentino A players
Chacarita Juniors footballers
Deportivo Merlo footballers
Flandria footballers
Deportivo Morón footballers
Club Comunicaciones footballers
Quilmes Atlético Club footballers
Talleres de Córdoba footballers
All Boys footballers
Sportivo Desamparados footballers
Club Atlético Brown footballers
Club Atlético Huracán footballers
Club Almirante Brown footballers
Sportspeople from Buenos Aires Province